Dulay Qarqi (also Romanized as Dūlāy Qārqī and Dūlā-ye Qārqī; also known as Dūlāy Qārī) is a village in Qomrud Rural District, in the Central District of Qom County, Qom Province, Iran. The 2006 Iran census noted its existence but not its population.

References 

Populated places in Qom Province